Aartoma or Aartomaa is a Finnish surname. Notable people with the surname include:

Kari Aartoma (born 1958), writer
Tapani Aartomaa (1934–2009), graphic designer
Ulla Aartomaa (born 1949), art writer and curator

Finnish-language surnames